In 1997 the International Ice Hockey Federation (IIHF) established the IIHF Hall of Fame in Zürich, Switzerland. The IIHF Hall of Fame is intended to honor individuals who have made valuable contributions both internationally and in their home countries. The first class, which was composed of Paul Loicq, plus 30 other individuals, was introduced during the 1997 World Championships in Helsinki, Finland. The IIHF established the Torriani Award in 2015, which is given annually to a player with an "outstanding career from non-top hockey nation". Members are inducted into the Hall into four separate categories: player, referee, builder (an individual that "manages" or grows the game), and the Torriani Award. There are 237 inductees as of 2021.

The IIHF and the Hockey Hall of Fame in Toronto, Ontario, Canada, agreed on a long-term contract whereby the Hockey Hall of Fame became the permanent residence for the IIHF Hall of Fame.  On 29 June 1998, the Hockey Hall of Fame opened its newly revamped Exhibition Center containing an international area known as the World of Hockey Zone, which houses the exhibits for the IIHF Hall of Fame. The IIHF also recognizes individuals with the Paul Loicq Award, presented to a person who has made "outstanding contributions to the IIHF and international ice hockey". Recipients of the Paul Loicq Award are not included in the list of inductees into the Hall of Fame.

Members 

List of the 237 inductees into the IIHF Hall of Fame, as of 2021:

Gallery

Members by country
List of the 237 IIHF Hall of Fame members by country, as of 2021:

Notes

References

IIHF Hall of Fame
Museums established in 1997